The Los Angeles Clippers are a basketball team that competes in the National Basketball Association (NBA). The team has played in three different locations since the franchise was founded in 1970. They were known as the Buffalo Braves from 1970 to 1978, the San Diego Clippers from 1978 to 1984, and the Los Angeles Clippers since 1984.



Players
Note: Statistics are correct through the end of the  season.

A to B

|-
|align="left"| || align="center"|F/C || align="left"|Iowa State || align="center"|1 || align="center"| || 22 || 195 || 90 || 7 || 83 || 8.9 || 4.1 || 0.3 || 3.8 || align=center|
|-
|align="left"| || align="center"|G || align="left"|Pepperdine || align="center"|1 || align="center"| || 18 || 179 || 22 || 11 || 63 || 9.9 || 1.2 || 0.6 || 3.5 || align=center|
|-
|align="left"| || align="center"|F || align="left"|Northwestern || align="center"|2 || align="center"|– || 133 || 2,414 || 516 || 223 || 735 || 18.2 || 3.9 || 1.7 || 5.5 || align=center|
|-
|align="left"| || align="center"|G/F || align="left"|DePaul || align="center"|1 || align="center"| || 39 || 859 || 116 || 104 || 413 || 22.0 || 3.0 || 2.7 || 10.6 || align=center|
|-
|align="left"| || align="center"|C || align="left"|Kansas || align="center"|1 || align="center"| || 60 || 800 || 288 || 50 || 328 || 13.3 || 4.8 || 0.8 || 5.5 || align=center|
|-
|align="left"| || align="center"|F || align="left"|Wake Forest || align="center"|1 || align="center"| || 81 || 1,452 || 267 || 60 || 457 || 17.9 || 3.3 || 0.7 || 5.6 || align=center|
|-
|align="left"| || align="center"|G/F || align="left"|Michigan State || align="center"|1 || align="center"| || 30 || 308 || 24 || 11 || 86 || 10.3 || 0.8 || 0.4 || 2.9 || align=center|
|-
|align="left"| || align="center"|G || align="left"|Kentucky || align="center"|1 || align="center"| || 64 || 2,201 || 258 || 220 || 1,080 || 34.4 || 4.0 || 3.4 || 16.9 || align=center|
|-
|align="left"| || align="center"|G || align="left"|Georgia Tech || align="center"|1 || align="center"| || 4 || 26 || 5 || 5 || 8 || 6.5 || 1.3 || 1.3 || 2.0 || align=center|
|-
|align="left"| || align="center"|F/C || align="left"|UC Santa Barbara || align="center"|1 || align="center"| || 78 || 1,274 || 272 || 120 || 403 || 16.3 || 3.5 || 1.5 || 5.2 || align=center|
|-
|align="left"| || align="center"|C || align="left"|Arizona State || align="center"|1 || align="center"| || 26 || 895 || 227 || 88 || 396 || 34.4 || 8.7 || 3.4 || 15.2 || align=center|
|-
|align="left"| || align="center"|F || align="left"|Seton Hall || align="center"|1 || align="center"| || 49 || 377 || 74 || 11 || 81 || 7.7 || 1.5 || 0.2 || 1.7 || align=center|
|-
|align="left"| || align="center"|G || align="left"|Pepperdine || align="center"|2 || align="center"|– || 109 || 1,812 || 128 || 262 || 911 || 16.6 || 1.2 || 2.4 || 8.4 || align=center|
|-
|align="left"| || align="center"|F || align="left"|Arizona State || align="center"|1 || align="center"| || 17 || 107 || 22 || 5 || 30 || 6.3 || 1.3 || 0.3 || 1.8 || align=center|
|-
|align="left"| || align="center"|G || align="left"|Oklahoma State || align="center"|1 || align="center"| || 1 || 1 || 0 || 0 || 0 || 1.0 || 0.0 || 0.0 || 0.0 || align=center|
|-
|align="left"| || align="center"|F || align="left"|Hartford || align="center"|1 || align="center"| || 8 || 85 || 19 || 4 || 27 || 10.6 || 2.4 || 0.5 || 3.4 || align=center|
|-
|align="left"| || align="center"|F || align="left"|Charlotte || align="center"|1 || align="center"| || 7 || 26 || 11 || 0 || 8 || 3.7 || 1.6 || 0.0 || 1.1 || align=center|
|-
|align="left"| || align="center"|F/C || align="left"|Saint Augustine's || align="center"|3 || align="center"|– || 108 || 1,058 || 241 || 30 || 391 || 9.8 || 2.2 || 0.3 || 3.6 || align=center|
|-
|align="left"| || align="center"|F/C || align="left"|Providence || align="center"|2 || align="center"| || 68 || 1,664 || 425 || 135 || 630 || 24.5 || 6.3 || 2.0 || 9.3 || align=center|
|-
|align="left"| || align="center"|F || align="left"|UCLA || align="center"|4 || align="center"|– || 257 || 6,788 || 1,111 || 410 || 2,382 || 26.4 || 4.3 || 1.6 || 9.3 || align=center|
|-
|align="left"| || align="center"|G || align="left"|Seton Hall || align="center"|1 || align="center"| || 4 || 25 || 1 || 7 || 6 || 6.3 || 0.3 || 1.8 || 1.5 || align=center|
|-
|align="left"| || align="center"|G || align="left"|Oregon State || align="center"|3 || align="center"|– || 179 || 4,333 || 421 || 516 || 1,803 || 24.2 || 2.4 || 2.9 || 10.1 || align=center|
|-
|align="left"| || align="center"|F || align="left"|LSU || align="center"|1 || align="center"| || 52 || 577 || 129 || 21 || 292 || 11.1 || 2.5 || 0.4 || 5.6 || align=center|
|-
|align="left"| || align="center"|C || align="left"|Creighton || align="center"|6 || align="center"|– || 406 || 12,724 || 3,538 || 776 || 5,405 || 31.3 || 8.7 || 1.9 || 13.3 || align=center|
|-
|align="left"| || align="center"|F || align="left"|Arizona State || align="center"|1 || align="center"| || 1 || 3 || 2 || 0 || 0 || 3.0 || 2.0 || 0.0 || 0.0 || align=center|
|-
|align="left" bgcolor="#CCFFCC"|x || align="center"|G || align="left"|Arkansas || align="center"|2 || align="center"|– || 89 || 2,471 || 433 || 332 || 730 || 27.8 || 4.9 || 3.7 || 8.2 || align=center|
|-
|align="left"| || align="center"|G || align="left"|UCLA || align="center"|1 || align="center"| || 73 || 1,112 || 74 || 200 || 335 || 15.2 || 1.0 || 2.7 || 4.6 || align=center|
|-
|align="left"| || align="center"|G/F || align="left"|Penn || align="center"|1 || align="center"| || 29 || 413 || 46 || 25 || 85 || 14.2 || 1.6 || 0.9 || 2.9 || align=center|
|-
|align="left"| || align="center"|G || align="left"|Colorado || align="center"|2 || align="center"|– || 42 || 1,025 || 82 || 129 || 483 || 24.4 || 2.0 || 3.1 || 11.5 || align=center|
|-
|align="left"| || align="center"|G || align="left"|Maryland || align="center"|1 || align="center"| || 29 || 762 || 69 || 177 || 198 || 26.3 || 2.4 || 6.1 || 6.8 || align=center|
|-
|align="left"| || align="center"|G || align="left"|Kentucky || align="center"|3 || align="center"|– || 197 || 3,858 || 513 || 588 || 1,318 || 19.6 || 2.6 || 3.0 || 6.7 || align=center|
|-
|align="left"| || align="center"|F || align="left"|Auburn Montgomery || align="center"|1 || align="center"| || 11 || 113 || 30 || 5 || 26 || 10.3 || 2.7 || 0.5 || 2.4 || align=center|
|-
|align="left"| || align="center"|C || align="left"|Wichita State || align="center"|1 || align="center"| || 44 || 483 || 173 || 41 || 136 || 11.0 || 3.9 || 0.9 || 3.1 || align=center|
|-
|align="left"| || align="center"|G || align="left"|Eastern Michigan || align="center"|2 || align="center"|– || 78 || 910 || 65 || 177 || 345 || 11.7 || 0.8 || 2.3 || 4.4 || align=center|
|-
|align="left"| || align="center"|G || align="left"|Texas || align="center"|2 || align="center"|– || 55 || 1,628 || 153 || 107 || 455 || 29.6 || 2.8 || 1.9 || 8.3 || align=center|
|-
|align="left" bgcolor="#FFCC00"|+ || align="center"|F || align="left"|Duke || align="center"|7 || align="center"|– || 459 || 17,595 || 4,710 || 1,242 || 9,336 || 38.3 || 10.3 || 2.7 || 20.3 || align=center|
|-
|align="left"| || align="center"|G/F || align="left"|Louisville || align="center"|2 || align="center"|– || 138 || 3,203 || 353 || 279 || 1,625 || 23.2 || 2.6 || 2.0 || 11.8 || align=center|
|-
|align="left"| || align="center"|G || align="left"|West Virginia Wesleyan || align="center"|2 || align="center"|– || 121 || 1,493 || 182 || 222 || 619 || 12.3 || 1.5 || 1.8 || 5.1 || align=center|
|-
|align="left"| || align="center"|G || align="left"|Notre Dame || align="center"|1 || align="center"| || 13 || 130 || 12 || 20 || 54 || 10.0 || 0.9 || 1.5 || 4.2 || align=center|
|-
|align="left"| || align="center"|F || align="left"|La Salle || align="center"|4 || align="center"|– || 293 || 9,091 || 1,929 || 794 || 4,010 || 31.0 || 6.6 || 2.7 || 13.7 || align=center|
|-
|align="left"| || align="center"|G || align="left"|Cal State Fullerton || align="center"|1 || align="center"| || 23 || 191 || 20 || 42 || 70 || 8.3 || 0.9 || 1.8 || 3.0 || align=center|
|-
|align="left"| || align="center"|G/F || align="left"|Arkansas || align="center"|1 || align="center"| || 22 || 254 || 28 || 16 || 103 || 11.5 || 1.3 || 0.7 || 4.7 || align=center|
|-
|align="left"| || align="center"|G || align="left"|Temple || align="center"|1 || align="center"| || 80 || 1,945 || 187 || 410 || 437 || 24.3 || 2.3 || 5.1 || 5.5 || align=center|
|-
|align="left"| || align="center"|G || align="left"|DePaul || align="center"|2 || align="center"|– || 127 || 3,360 || 389 || 558 || 1,004 || 26.5 || 3.1 || 4.4 || 7.9 || align=center|
|-
|align="left"| || align="center"|F/C || align="left"|La Salle || align="center"|3 || align="center"|– || 238 || 6,675 || 1,230 || 522 || 2,591 || 28.0 || 5.2 || 2.2 || 10.9 || align=center|
|-
|align="left"| || align="center"|C || align="left"|San Francisco || align="center"|1 || align="center"| || 8 || 64 || 20 || 4 || 13 || 8.0 || 2.5 || 0.5 || 1.6 || align=center|
|-
|align="left"| || align="center"|C || align="left"|Texas State || align="center"|1 || align="center"| || 3 || 10 || 2 || 0 || 4 || 3.3 || 0.7 || 0.0 || 1.3 || align=center|
|-
|align="left"| || align="center"|G/F || align="left"|North Carolina || align="center"|2 || align="center"|– || 68 || 658 || 94 || 18 || 180 || 9.7 || 1.4 || 0.3 || 2.6 || align=center|
|-
|align="left"| || align="center"|G || align="left"|Iona || align="center"|1 || align="center"| || 19 || 312 || 27 || 38 || 171 || 16.4 || 1.4 || 2.0 || 9.0 || align=center|
|-
|align="left"| || align="center"|F || align="left"|UConn || align="center"|2 || align="center"|– || 141 || 3,750 || 453 || 156 || 1,566 || 26.6 || 3.2 || 1.1 || 11.1 || align=center|
|-
|align="left"| || align="center"|C || align="left"|Stanford || align="center"|1 || align="center"| || 9 || 37 || 16 || 1 || 14 || 4.1 || 1.8 || 0.1 || 1.6 || align=center|
|-
|align="left"| || align="center"|G/F || align="left"|La Salle || align="center"|2 || align="center"|– || 123 || 3,446 || 316 || 143 || 1,185 || 28.0 || 2.6 || 1.2 || 9.6 || align=center|
|}

C

|-
|align="left"| || align="center"|F/C || align="left"|San Diego State || align="center"|4 || align="center"|– || 305 || 8,758 || 2,669 || 373 || 3,355 || 28.7 || 8.8 || 1.2 || 11.0 || align=center|
|-
|align="left"| || align="center"|F/C || align="left"|UMass || align="center"|2 || align="center"|– || 113 || 3,521 || 1,306 || 278 || 1,035 || 31.2 || 11.6 || 2.5 || 9.2 || align=center|
|-
|align="left"| || align="center"|G/F || align="left"|Boston College || align="center"|1 || align="center"| || 10 || 134 || 13 || 3 || 36 || 13.4 || 1.3 || 0.3 || 3.6 || align=center|
|-
|align="left"| || align="center"|G || align="left"|Florida State || align="center"|3 || align="center"|– || 174 || 5,035 || 559 || 940 || 2,545 || 28.9 || 3.2 || 5.4 || 14.6 || align=center|
|-
|align="left"| || align="center"|F/C || align="left"|Hardin-Simmons || align="center"|1 || align="center"| || 70 || 1,049 || 262 || 14 || 203 || 15.0 || 3.7 || 0.2 || 2.9 || align=center|
|-
|align="left"| || align="center"|G || align="left"|Xavier || align="center"|1 || align="center"| || 36 || 433 || 31 || 51 || 111 || 12.0 || 0.9 || 1.4 || 3.1 || align=center|
|-
|align="left"| || align="center"|F || align="left"|Utah || align="center"|1 || align="center"| || 26 || 369 || 67 || 23 || 178 || 14.2 || 2.6 || 0.9 || 6.8 || align=center|
|-
|align="left"| || align="center"|F/C || align="left"|Utah || align="center"|2 || align="center"|– || 160 || 5,347 || 1,080 || 338 || 2,783 || 33.4 || 6.8 || 2.1 || 17.4 || align=center|
|-
|align="left"| || align="center"|F || align="left"|DePaul || align="center"|1 || align="center"| || 15 || 226 || 47 || 10 || 64 || 15.1 || 3.1 || 0.7 || 4.3 || align=center|
|-
|align="left"| || align="center"|G || align="left"|Fordham || align="center"|3 || align="center"|– || 219 || 4,630 || 448 || 429 || 1,646 || 21.1 || 2.0 || 2.0 || 7.5 || align=center|
|-
|align="left"| || align="center"|F/C || align="left"|North Carolina || align="center"|1 || align="center"| || 24 || 347 || 79 || 16 || 73 || 14.5 || 3.3 || 0.7 || 3.0 || align=center|
|-
|align="left"| || align="center"|G/F || align="left"|Pepperdine || align="center"|1 || align="center"| || 7 || 82 || 11 || 8 || 13 || 11.7 || 1.6 || 1.1 || 1.9 || align=center|
|-
|align="left"| || align="center"|C || align="left"|Central Connecticut || align="center"|3 || align="center"|– || 130 || 1,647 || 372 || 44 || 502 || 12.7 || 2.9 || 0.3 || 3.9 || align=center|
|-
|align="left"| || align="center"|F || align="left"|Kansas State || align="center"|1 || align="center"| || 29 || 431 || 81 || 13 || 153 || 14.9 || 2.8 || 0.4 || 5.3 || align=center|
|-
|align="left"| || align="center"|G || align="left"|Florida State || align="center"|1 || align="center"| || 23 || 103 || 14 || 3 || 59 || 4.5 || 0.6 || 0.1 || 2.6 || align=center|
|-
|align="left"| || align="center"|F/C || align="left"|Stanford || align="center"|1 || align="center"| || 23 || 157 || 17 || 1 || 17 || 6.8 || 0.7 || 0.0 || 0.7 || align=center|
|-
|align="left"| || align="center"|G || align="left"|Temple || align="center"|2 || align="center"|– || 82 || 1,285 || 149 || 145 || 342 || 15.7 || 1.8 || 1.8 || 4.2 || align=center|
|-
|align="left"| || align="center"|G || align="left"|UCLA || align="center"|1 || align="center"| || 80 || 2,069 || 188 || 297 || 911 || 25.9 || 2.4 || 3.7 || 11.4 || align=center|
|-
|align="left"| || align="center"|F/C || align="left"|Providence || align="center"|1 || align="center"| || 3 || 9 || 2 || 0 || 2 || 3.0 || 0.7 || 0.0 || 0.7 || align=center|
|-
|align="left"| || align="center"|G || align="left"|Oregon State || align="center"|1 || align="center"| || 31 || 422 || 49 || 65 || 74 || 13.6 || 1.6 || 2.1 || 2.4 || align=center|
|-
|align="left"| || align="center"|G || align="left"|Washington || align="center"|1 || align="center"| || 4 || 35 || 5 || 8 || 0 || 8.8 || 1.3 || 2.0 || 0.0 || align=center|
|-
|align="left"| || align="center"|F || align="left"|Illinois || align="center"|2 || align="center"|– || 56 || 568 || 119 || 17 || 224 || 10.1 || 2.1 || 0.3 || 4.0 || align=center|
|-
|align="left"| || align="center"|F/C || align="left"|Colorado || align="center"|1 || align="center"| || 13 || 275 || 71 || 15 || 73 || 21.2 || 5.5 || 1.2 || 5.6 || align=center|
|-
|align="left"| || align="center"|G || align="left"|Georgia State || align="center"|1 || align="center"| || 10 || 48 || 7 || 5 || 16 || 4.8 || 0.7 || 0.5 || 1.6 || align=center|
|-
|align="left"| || align="center"|G/F || align="left"|St. Bonaventure || align="center"|1 || align="center"| || 15 || 203 || 35 || 24 || 88 || 13.5 || 2.3 || 1.6 || 5.9 || align=center|
|-
|align="left"| || align="center"|G || align="left"|Michigan || align="center"|5 || align="center"|– || 370 || 10,310 || 684 || 971 || 5,675 || 27.9 || 1.8 || 2.6 || 15.3 || align=center|
|-
|align="left"| || align="center"|G || align="left"|New Mexico State || align="center"|1 || align="center"| || 28 || 840 || 44 || 112 || 360 || 30.0 || 1.6 || 4.0 || 12.9 || align=center|
|-
|align="left"| || align="center"|F || align="left"|Maine || align="center"|1 || align="center"| || 21 || 128 || 30 || 1 || 26 || 6.1 || 1.4 || 0.0 || 1.2 || align=center|
|-
|align="left"| || align="center"|F || align="left"|DePaul || align="center"|2 || align="center"|– || 151 || 5,438 || 1,521 || 316 || 3,514 || 36.0 || 10.1 || 2.1 || 23.3 || align=center|
|-
|align="left"| || align="center"|G || align="left"|Oregon State || align="center"|1 || align="center"| || 19 || 89 || 9 || 10 || 35 || 4.7 || 0.5 || 0.5 || 1.8 || align=center|
|-
|align="left"| || align="center"|F/C || align="left"|Detroit Mercy || align="center"|2 || align="center"|– || 104 || 1,996 || 496 || 115 || 570 || 19.2 || 4.8 || 1.1 || 5.5 || align=center|
|-
|align="left"| || align="center"|G || align="left"|Oklahoma State || align="center"|1 || align="center"| || 1 || 0 || 0 || 0 || 0 || 0.0 || 0.0 || 0.0 || 0.0 || align=center|
|}

D

|-
|align="left"| || align="center"|G || align="left"|San Francisco || align="center"|3 || align="center"|– || 185 || 3,928 || 441 || 342 || 2,535 || 21.2 || 2.4 || 1.8 || 13.7 || align=center|
|-
|align="left" bgcolor="#FFFF99"|^ || align="center"|G/F || align="left"|Notre Dame || align="center"|1 || align="center"| || 77 || 2,816 || 587 || 144 || 1,564 || 36.6 || 7.6 || 1.9 || 20.3 || align=center|
|-
|align="left"| || align="center"|G || align="left"|UCLA || align="center"|3 || align="center"|– || 183 || 6,040 || 624 || 1,398 || 2,665 || 33.0 || 3.4 || 7.6 || 14.6 || align=center|
|-
|align="left"| || align="center"|F/C || align="left"|LSU || align="center"|2 || align="center"|– || 97 || 1,212 || 238 || 46 || 390 || 12.5 || 2.5 || 0.5 || 4.0 || align=center|
|-
|align="left"| || align="center"|G || align="left"|Virginia Union || align="center"|2 || align="center"|– || 135 || 2,685 || 307 || 235 || 1,397 || 19.9 || 2.3 || 1.7 || 10.3 || align=center|
|-
|align="left"| || align="center"|C || align="left"|Michigan State || align="center"|3 || align="center"|– || 80 || 694 || 158 || 29 || 212 || 8.7 || 2.0 || 0.4 || 2.7 || align=center|
|-
|align="left"| || align="center"|G || align="left"|Iowa || align="center"|2 || align="center"|– || 72 || 1,284 || 117 || 121 || 390 || 17.8 || 1.6 || 1.7 || 5.4 || align=center|
|-
|align="left"| || align="center"|G/F || align="left"|Washington State || align="center"|2 || align="center"|– || 71 || 884 || 132 || 51 || 397 || 12.5 || 1.9 || 0.7 || 5.6 || align=center|
|-
|align="left"| || align="center"|F || align="left"|Michigan State || align="center"|1 || align="center"| || 6 || 29 || 4 || 0 || 5 || 4.8 || 0.7 || 0.0 || 0.8 || align=center|
|-
|align="left"| || align="center"|G || align="left"|Seton Hall || align="center"|4 || align="center"|– || 299 || 5,604 || 458 || 811 || 2,663 || 18.7 || 1.5 || 2.7 || 8.9 || align=center|
|-
|align="left"| || align="center"|F || align="left"|Wisconsin || align="center"|1 || align="center"| || 73 || 883 || 174 || 38 || 303 || 12.1 || 2.4 || 0.5 || 4.2 || align=center|
|-
|align="left"| || align="center"|C || align="left"|Seton Hall || align="center"|1 || align="center"| || 2 || 15 || 4 || 0 || 3 || 7.5 || 2.0 || 0.0 || 1.5 || align=center|
|-
|align="left"| || align="center"|G || align="left"|Miami (FL) || align="center"|1 || align="center"| || 6 || 18 || 2 || 1 || 5 || 3.0 || 0.3 || 0.2 || 0.8 || align=center|
|-
|align="left"| || align="center"|G || align="left"|Gonzaga || align="center"|1 || align="center"| || 67 || 1,040 || 97 || 172 || 352 || 15.5 || 1.4 || 2.6 || 5.3 || align=center|
|-
|align="left"| || align="center"|G || align="left"|Providence || align="center"|4 || align="center"|– || 260 || 7,253 || 560 || 1,457 || 2,793 || 27.9 || 2.2 || 5.6 || 10.7 || align=center|
|-
|align="left"| || align="center"|F || align="left"|Arizona State || align="center"|1 || align="center"| || 36 || 470 || 115 || 2 || 207 || 13.1 || 3.2 || 0.1 || 5.8 || align=center|
|-
|align="left"| || align="center"|C || align="left"|Washington State || align="center"|3 || align="center"|– || 178 || 5,358 || 1,448 || 150 || 2,041 || 30.1 || 8.1 || 0.8 || 11.5 || align=center|
|-
|align="left"| || align="center"|G || align="left"|Missouri || align="center"|4 || align="center"|– || 203 || 3,498 || 243 || 408 || 1,217 || 17.2 || 1.2 || 2.0 || 6.0 || align=center|
|-
|align="left"| || align="center"|G || align="left"|Kansas || align="center"|2 || align="center"|– || 67 || 1,043 || 91 || 147 || 452 || 15.6 || 1.4 || 2.2 || 6.7 || align=center|
|-
|align="left"| || align="center"|G || align="left"|Syracuse || align="center"|1 || align="center"| || 30 || 842 || 58 || 124 || 247 || 28.1 || 1.9 || 4.1 || 8.2 || align=center|
|-
|align="left"| || align="center"|G || align="left"|Memphis || align="center"|1 || align="center"| || 12 || 103 || 12 || 4 || 19 || 8.6 || 1.0 || 0.3 || 1.6 || align=center|
|-
|align="left"| || align="center"|G || align="left"|Missouri || align="center"|2 || align="center"|– || 134 || 3,590 || 222 || 709 || 1,506 || 26.8 || 1.7 || 5.3 || 11.2 || align=center|
|-
|align="left"| || align="center"|C || align="left"|Montenegro || align="center"|1 || align="center"| || 61 || 949 || 196 || 39 || 382 || 15.6 || 3.2 || 0.6 || 6.3 || align=center|
|-
|align="left"| || align="center"|C || align="left"|Eastern Illinois || align="center"|1 || align="center"| || 26 || 384 || 60 || 16 || 104 || 14.8 || 2.3 || 0.6 || 4.0 || align=center|
|-
|align="left"| || align="center"|G/F || align="left"|Boston College || align="center"|1 || align="center"| || 74 || 1,729 || 160 || 104 || 511 || 23.4 || 2.2 || 1.4 || 6.9 || align=center|
|}

E to F

|-
|align="left"| || align="center"|G || align="left"|Cleveland State || align="center"|2 || align="center"|– || 89 || 1,689 || 100 || 297 || 748 || 19.0 || 1.1 || 3.3 || 8.4 || align=center|
|-
|align="left"| || align="center"|F/C || align="left"|Washington || align="center"|1 || align="center"| || 72 || 1,437 || 202 || 53 || 698 || 20.0 || 2.8 || 0.7 || 9.7 || align=center|
|-
|align="left"| || align="center"|G || align="left"|Indiana || align="center"|1 || align="center"| || 4 || 26 || 2 || 4 || 7 || 6.5 || 0.5 || 1.0 || 1.8 || align=center|
|-
|align="left"| || align="center"|G || align="left"|Boston College || align="center"|1 || align="center"| || 13 || 112 || 14 || 25 || 9 || 8.6 || 1.1 || 1.9 || 0.7 || align=center|
|-
|align="left"| || align="center"|F/C || align="left"|Maryland || align="center"|1 || align="center"| || 29 || 152 || 34 || 3 || 54 || 5.2 || 1.2 || 0.1 || 1.9 || align=center|
|-
|align="left"| || align="center"|G || align="left"|Morehouse || align="center"|2 || align="center"|– || 118 || 1,579 || 241 || 71 || 676 || 13.4 || 2.0 || 0.6 || 5.7 || align=center|
|-
|align="left"| || align="center"|F/C || align="left"|Syracuse || align="center"|1 || align="center"| || 29 || 103 || 24 || 1 || 43 || 3.6 || 0.8 || 0.0 || 1.5 || align=center|
|-
|align="left"| || align="center"|C || align="left"|Fresno State || align="center"|2 || align="center"|– || 94 || 1,312 || 275 || 37 || 393 || 14.0 || 2.9 || 0.4 || 4.2 || align=center|
|-
|align="left"| || align="center"|G || align="left"|Oklahoma State || align="center"|1 || align="center"| || 48 || 778 || 84 || 100 || 231 || 16.2 || 1.8 || 2.1 || 4.8 || align=center|
|-
|align="left"| || align="center"|F || align="left"|Iowa || align="center"|1 || align="center"| || 56 || 771 || 271 || 17 || 104 || 13.8 || 4.8 || 0.3 || 1.9 || align=center|
|-
|align="left"| || align="center"|G || align="left"|Duke || align="center"|2 || align="center"|– || 127 || 1,683 || 158 || 174 || 431 || 13.3 || 1.2 || 1.4 || 3.4 || align=center|
|-
|align="left"| || align="center"|G || align="left"|UCLA || align="center"|1 || align="center"| || 36 || 529 || 42 || 67 || 167 || 14.7 || 1.2 || 1.9 || 4.6 || align=center|
|-
|align="left"| || align="center"|F || align="left"|Nevada || align="center"|1 || align="center"| || 22 || 260 || 86 || 11 || 103 || 11.8 || 3.9 || 0.5 || 4.7 || align=center|
|-
|align="left"| || align="center"|G || align="left"|North Carolina || align="center"|1 || align="center"| || 80 || 1,700 || 218 || 191 || 538 || 21.3 || 2.7 || 2.4 || 6.7 || align=center|
|-
|align="left"| || align="center"|G/F || align="left"|UCLA || align="center"|2 || align="center"|– || 51 || 1,015 || 175 || 70 || 433 || 19.9 || 3.4 || 1.4 || 8.5 || align=center|
|-
|align="left"| || align="center"|C || align="left"|UNC Wilmington || align="center"|1 || align="center"| || 26 || 370 || 84 || 17 || 123 || 14.2 || 3.2 || 0.7 || 4.7 || align=center|
|-
|align="left"| || align="center"|G || align="left"|Arkansas || align="center"|1 || align="center"| || 4 || 46 || 8 || 5 || 17 || 11.5 || 2.0 || 1.3 || 4.3 || align=center|
|-
|align="left"| || align="center"|F || align="left"|Miami (OH) || align="center"|1 || align="center"| || 59 || 689 || 76 || 48 || 228 || 11.7 || 1.3 || 0.8 || 3.9 || align=center|
|-
|align="left"| || align="center"|F || align="left"|Fresno State || align="center"|2 || align="center"|– || 59 || 916 || 167 || 40 || 238 || 15.5 || 2.8 || 0.7 || 4.0 || align=center|
|-
|align="left"| || align="center"|G || align="left"|Jacksonville || align="center"|1 || align="center"| || 10 || 84 || 8 || 10 || 31 || 8.4 || 0.8 || 1.0 || 3.1 || align=center|
|-
|align="left"| || align="center"|G || align="left"|Villanova || align="center"|2 || align="center"|– || 128 || 3,233 || 241 || 316 || 1,328 || 25.3 || 1.9 || 2.5 || 10.4 || align=center|
|-
|align="left"| || align="center"|G || align="left"|Gonzaga || align="center"|1 || align="center"| || 10 || 163 || 14 || 8 || 47 || 16.3 || 1.4 || 0.8 || 4.7 || align=center|
|-
|align="left" bgcolor="#FFCC00"|+ || align="center"|G || align="left"|Guilford || align="center"|2 || align="center"|– || 146 || 5,539 || 539 || 623 || 4,299 || 37.9 || 3.7 || 4.3 || bgcolor="#CFECEC"|29.4 || align=center|
|}

G

|-
|align="left"| || align="center"|F || align="left"|Italy || align="center"|2 || align="center"|– || 89 || 2,730 || 518 || 219 || 1,667 || 30.7 || 5.8 || 2.5 || 18.7 || align=center|
|-
|align="left"| || align="center"|G || align="left"|Missouri State || align="center"|2 || align="center"|– || 97 || 2,573 || 301 || 463 || 868 || 26.5 || 3.1 || 4.8 || 8.9 || align=center|
|-
|align="left"| || align="center"|G || align="left"|Southern Illinois || align="center"|3 || align="center"|– || 226 || 6,085 || 729 || 646 || 2,528 || 26.9 || 3.2 || 2.9 || 11.2 || align=center|
|-
|align="left"| || align="center"|G || align="left"|Rhode Island || align="center"|3 || align="center"|– || 211 || 4,169 || 445 || 755 || 1,222 || 19.8 || 2.1 || 3.6 || 5.8 || align=center|
|-
|align="left"| || align="center"|F || align="left"|Boston University || align="center"|1 || align="center"| || 6 || 11 || 5 || 0 || 2 || 1.8 || 0.8 || 0.0 || 0.3 || align=center|
|-
|align="left" bgcolor="#CCFFCC"|x || align="center"|F || align="left"|Fresno State || align="center"|1 || align="center"|– || 48 || 5,732 || 1,075 || 581 || 3,893 || 36.7 || 6.9 || 3.7 || 25.0 || align=center|
|-
|align="left"| || align="center"|G/F || align="left"|Virginia || align="center"|2 || align="center"|– || 51 || 677 || 131 || 52 || 283 || 13.3 || 2.6 || 1.0 || 5.5 || align=center|
|-
|align="left"| || align="center"|F/C || align="left"|Pacific || align="center"|1 || align="center"| || 57 || 1,283 || 297 || 57 || 397 || 22.5 || 5.2 || 1.0 || 7.0 || align=center|
|-
|align="left"| || align="center"|G/F || align="left"|UTEP || align="center"|1 || align="center"| || 72 || 866 || 106 || 49 || 335 || 12.0 || 1.5 || 0.7 || 4.7 || align=center|
|-
|align="left"| || align="center"|G || align="left"|Kentucky || align="center"|1 || align="center"| || 82 || 2,174 || 232 || 270 || 889 || 26.5 || 2.8 || 3.3 || 10.8 || align=center|
|-
|align="left"| || align="center"|G/F || align="left"|Purdue || align="center"|1 || align="center"| || 80 || 2,082 || 334 || 291 || 898 || 26.0 || 4.2 || 3.6 || 11.2 || align=center|
|-
|align="left"| || align="center"|G || align="left"|Southern Illinois || align="center"|1 || align="center"| || 56 || 947 || 79 || 78 || 441 || 16.9 || 1.4 || 1.4 || 7.9 || align=center|
|-
|align="left"| || align="center"|G || align="left"|Houston || align="center"|1 || align="center"| || 3 || 22 || 1 || 2 || 2 || 7.3 || 0.3 || 0.7 || 0.7 || align=center|
|-
|align="left"| || align="center"|F || align="left"|Providence || align="center"|2 || align="center"|– || 108 || 2,520 || 315 || 130 || 621 || 23.3 || 2.9 || 1.2 || 5.8 || align=center|
|-
|align="left"| || align="center"|G || align="left"|Pepperdine || align="center"|1 || align="center"| || 27 || 244 || 36 || 34 || 105 || 9.0 || 1.3 || 1.3 || 3.9 || align=center|
|-
|align="left"| || align="center"|F || align="left"|Kansas || align="center"|1 || align="center"| || 24 || 725 || 226 || 21 || 355 || 30.2 || 9.4 || 0.9 || 14.8 || align=center|
|-
|align="left"| || align="center"|G || align="left"|Indiana || align="center"|3 || align="center"|– || 196 || 7,018 || 525 || 645 || 3,544 || 35.8 || 2.7 || 3.3 || 18.1 || align=center|
|-
|align="left"| || align="center"|G || align="left"|Louisville || align="center"|4 || align="center"|– || 201 || 2,581 || 259 || 294 || 1,125 || 12.8 || 1.3 || 1.5 || 5.6 || align=center|
|-
|align="left"| || align="center"|F/C || align="left"|Poland || align="center"|1 || align="center"| || 47 || 751 || 261 || 65 || 233 || 16.0 || 5.6 || 1.4 || 5.0 || align=center|
|-
|align="left"| || align="center"|F || align="left"|New Mexico || align="center"|1 || align="center"| || 12 || 194 || 28 || 8 || 96 || 16.2 || 2.3 || 0.7 || 8.0 || align=center|
|-
|align="left"| || align="center"|G || align="left"|Michigan || align="center"|7 || align="center"|– || 446 || 11,234 || 1,142 || 2,810 || 3,899 || 25.2 || 2.6 || 6.3 || 8.7 || align=center|
|-
|align="left" bgcolor="#CCFFCC"|x || align="center"|F || align="left"|Alabama || align="center"|1 || align="center"| || 24 || 471 || 157 || 14 || 208 || 19.6 || 6.5 || 0.6 || 8.7 || align=center|
|-
|align="left"| || align="center"|F || align="left"|Georgetown || align="center"|1 || align="center"| || 27 || 709 || 91 || 40 || 293 || 26.3 || 3.4 || 1.5 || 10.9 || align=center|
|-
|align="left"| || align="center"|G || align="left"|Detroit Mercy || align="center"|2 || align="center"|– || 127 || 2,057 || 175 || 105 || 723 || 16.2 || 1.4 || 0.8 || 5.7 || align=center|
|-
|align="left"| || align="center"|F || align="left"|Wisconsin || align="center"|1 || align="center"| || 23 || 313 || 95 || 16 || 134 || 13.6 || 4.1 || 0.7 || 5.8 || align=center|
|-
|align="left" bgcolor="#FFCC00"|+ || align="center"|F || align="left"|Oklahoma || align="center"|8 || align="center"|– || 504 || 17,706 || 4,686 || 2,133 || 10,863 || 35.1 || 9.3 || 4.2 || 21.6 || align=center|
|-
|align="left"| || align="center"|G/F || align="left"|Long Beach State || align="center"|1 || align="center"| || 27 || 373 || 66 || 34 || 83 || 13.8 || 2.4 || 1.3 || 3.1 || align=center|
|-
|align="left"| || align="center"|G/F || align="left"|Saint Joseph's || align="center"|1 || align="center"| || 27 || 549 || 40 || 69 || 132 || 20.3 || 1.5 || 2.6 || 4.9 || align=center|
|}

H

|-
|align="left"| || align="center"|G/F || align="left"|Texas || align="center"|1 || align="center"| || 14 || 122 || 16 || 7 || 38 || 8.7 || 1.1 || 0.5 || 2.7 || align=center|
|-
|align="left"| || align="center"|F/C || align="left"|St. John's || align="center"|1 || align="center"| || 3 || 19 || 8 || 0 || 9 || 6.3 || 2.7 || 0.0 || 3.0 || align=center|
|-
|align="left"| || align="center"|G/F || align="left"|Miami (OH) || align="center"|5 || align="center"|– || 304 || 11,458 || 1,678 || 1,463 || 5,853 || 37.7 || 5.5 || 4.8 || 19.3 || align=center|
|-
|align="left" bgcolor="#CCFFCC"|x || align="center"|F/C || align="left"|Louisville || align="center"|2 || align="center"|– || 158 || 3,451 || 841 || 236 || 2,197 || 21.8 || 5.3 || 1.5 || 13.9 || align=center|
|-
|align="left"| || align="center"|F || align="left"|VCU || align="center"|1 || align="center"| || 11 || 25 || 8 || 1 || 5 || 2.3 || 0.7 || 0.1 || 0.5 || align=center|
|-
|align="left"| || align="center"|G || align="left"|Tulsa || align="center"|1 || align="center"| || 15 || 93 || 10 || 1 || 31 || 6.2 || 0.7 || 0.1 || 2.1 || align=center|
|-
|align="left"| || align="center"|F || align="left"|Tennessee || align="center"|2 || align="center"|– || 87 || 3,008 || 625 || 248 || 1,770 || 34.6 || 7.2 || 2.9 || 20.3 || align=center|
|-
|align="left"| || align="center"|G || align="left"|Syracuse || align="center"|2 || align="center"| || 51 || 1,058 || 125 || 136 || 271 || 20.7 || 2.5 || 2.7 || 5.3 || align=center|
|-
|align="left"| || align="center"|F/C || align="left"|Pfeiffer || align="center"|1 || align="center"| || 37 || 411 || 106 || 6 || 106 || 11.1 || 2.9 || 0.2 || 2.9 || align=center|
|-
|align="left"| || align="center"|F/C || align="left"|Washington || align="center"|1 || align="center"| || 73 || 1,274 || 258 || 88 || 425 || 17.5 || 3.5 || 1.2 || 5.8 || align=center|
|-
|align="left"| || align="center"|G || align="left"|UCLA || align="center"|2 || align="center"|– || 81 || 2,523 || 223 || 423 || 1,190 || 31.1 || 2.8 || 5.2 || 14.7 || align=center|
|-
|align="left"| || align="center"|F || align="left"|Oklahoma || align="center"|4 || align="center"|– || 276 || 8,195 || 2,472 || 618 || 2,854 || 29.7 || 9.0 || 2.2 || 10.3 || align=center|
|-
|align="left"| || align="center"|F || align="left"|USC || align="center"|1 || align="center"| || 73 || 1,332 || 368 || 110 || 345 || 18.2 || 5.0 || 1.5 || 4.7 || align=center|
|-
|align="left"| || align="center"|G || align="left"|Princeton || align="center"|1 || align="center"| || 19 || 480 || 27 || 81 || 90 || 25.3 || 1.4 || 4.3 || 4.7 || align=center|
|-
|align="left" bgcolor="#FFFF99"|^ || align="center"|G/F || align="left"|Duke || align="center"|1 || align="center"| || 29 || 437 || 49 || 26 || 93 || 15.1 || 1.7 || 0.9 || 3.2 || align=center|
|-
|align="left"| || align="center"|G/F || align="left"|Grambling State || align="center"|2 || align="center"|– || 120 || 2,080 || 254 || 190 || 1,131 || 17.3 || 2.1 || 1.6 || 9.4 || align=center|
|-
|align="left"| || align="center"|G || align="left"|Long Beach State || align="center"|2 || align="center"|– || 152 || 3,593 || 208 || 391 || 1,342 || 23.6 || 1.4 || 2.6 || 8.8 || align=center|
|-
|align="left"| || align="center"|G || align="left"|Arizona State || align="center"|1 || align="center"| || 56 || 1,844 || 128 || 373 || 758 || 32.9 || 2.3 || 6.7 || 13.5 || align=center|
|-
|align="left"| || align="center"|C || align="left"|UCLA || align="center"|2 || align="center"|– || 121 || 1,145 || 229 || 19 || 347 || 9.5 || 1.9 || 0.2 || 2.9 || align=center|
|-
|align="left"| || align="center"|F/C || align="left"|Ohio State || align="center"|2 || align="center"|– || 57 || 809 || 198 || 58 || 325 || 14.2 || 3.5 || 1.0 || 5.7 || align=center|
|-
|align="left"| || align="center"|G || align="left"|Arizona State || align="center"|1 || align="center"| || 60 || 1,188 || 138 || 148 || 409 || 19.8 || 2.3 || 2.5 || 6.8 || align=center|
|-
|align="left"| || align="center"|G || align="left"|UT Martin || align="center"|1 || align="center"| || 5 || 56 || 8 || 5 || 18 || 11.2 || 1.6 || 1.0 || 3.6 || align=center|
|-
|align="left"| || align="center"|G || align="left"|Southern Illinois || align="center"|2 || align="center"|– || 87 || 2,116 || 203 || 334 || 714 || 24.3 || 2.3 || 3.8 || 8.2 || align=center|
|-
|align="left"| || align="center"|F/C || align="left"|Princeton || align="center"|3 || align="center"|– || 202 || 5,369 || 1,269 || 373 || 1,724 || 26.6 || 6.3 || 1.8 || 8.5 || align=center|
|-
|align="left"| || align="center"|G || align="left"|Texas Tech || align="center"|1 || align="center"| || 19 || 428 || 17 || 101 || 129 || 22.5 || 0.9 || 5.3 || 6.8 || align=center|
|}

J

|-
|align="left"| || align="center"|G/F || align="left"|Georgetown || align="center"|1 || align="center"| || 34 || 350 || 39 || 35 || 131 || 10.3 || 1.1 || 1.0 || 3.9 || align=center|
|-
|align="left"| || align="center"|F || align="left"|Oregon || align="center"|1 || align="center"| || 3 || 16 || 1 || 4 || 3 || 5.3 || 0.3 || 1.3 || 1.0 || align=center|
|-
|align="left"| || align="center"|G || align="left"|St. John's || align="center"|2 || align="center"|– || 161 || 5,828 || 736 || 1,402 || 2,046 || 36.2 || 4.6 || 8.7 || 12.7 || align=center|
|-
|align="left"| || align="center"|G/F || align="left"|Butler CC || align="center"|1 || align="center"| || 9 || 107 || 10 || 5 || 15 || 11.9 || 1.1 || 0.6 || 1.7 || align=center|
|-
|align="left"| || align="center"|F || align="left"|St. Mary's (TX) || align="center"|1 || align="center"| || 12 || 75 || 14 || 1 || 41 || 6.3 || 1.2 || 0.1 || 3.4 || align=center|
|-
|align="left"| || align="center"|F || align="left"|North Carolina || align="center"|1 || align="center"| || 22 || 248 || 55 || 7 || 84 || 11.3 || 2.5 || 0.3 || 3.8 || align=center|
|-
|align="left"| || align="center"|F || align="left"|Clemson || align="center"|1 || align="center"| || 25 || 176 || 39 || 6 || 54 || 7.0 || 1.6 || 0.2 || 2.2 || align=center|
|-
|align="left"| || align="center"|G || align="left"|Serbia || align="center"|3 || align="center"|– || 174 || 4,795 || 496 || 777 || 1,478 || 27.6 || 2.9 || 4.5 || 8.5 || align=center|
|-
|align="left"| || align="center"|F || align="left"|North Carolina || align="center"|2 || align="center"|– || 12 || 47 || 16 || 2 || 20 || 3.9 || 1.3 || 0.2 || 1.7 || align=center|
|-
|align="left"| || align="center"|F/C || align="left"|Dillard || align="center"|1 || align="center"| || 39 || 1,055 || 400 || 78 || 296 || 27.1 || 10.3 || 2.0 || 7.6 || align=center|
|-
|align="left"| || align="center"|G || align="left"|Kentucky || align="center"|1 || align="center"| || 4 || 38 || 5 || 7 || 6 || 9.5 || 1.3 || 1.8 || 1.5 || align=center|
|-
|align="left" bgcolor="#FFCC00"|+ || align="center"|G/F || align="left"|UCLA || align="center"|3 || align="center"|– || 157 || 5,355 || 877 || 559 || 2,872 || 34.1 || 5.6 || 3.6 || 18.3 || align=center|
|-
|align="left"| || align="center"|F || align="left"|San Diego State || align="center"|1 || align="center"| || 29 || 234 || 43 || 5 || 74 || 8.1 || 1.5 || 0.2 || 2.6 || align=center|
|-
|align="left"| || align="center"|G/F || align="left"|Syracuse || align="center"|3 || align="center"|– || 222 || 3,962 || 645 || 133 || 1,138 || 17.8 || 2.9 || 0.6 || 5.1 || align=center|
|-
|align="left"| || align="center"|G || align="left"|LIU Brooklyn || align="center"|1 || align="center"| || 56 || 662 || 62 || 94 || 188 || 11.8 || 1.1 || 1.7 || 3.4 || align=center|
|-
|align="left"| || align="center"|G/F || align="left"|Duke || align="center"|1 || align="center"| || 33 || 123 || 11 || 2 || 21 || 3.7 || 0.3 || 0.1 || 0.6 || align=center|
|-
|align="left"| || align="center"|G/F || align="left"|Oregon || align="center"|1 || align="center"| || 52 || 1,495 || 126 || 188 || 378 || 28.8 || 2.4 || 3.6 || 7.3 || align=center|
|-
|align="left"| || align="center"|F || align="left"|Vanderbilt || align="center"|2 || align="center"|– || 13 || 103 || 17 || 4 || 41 || 7.9 || 1.3 || 0.3 || 3.2 || align=center|
|-
|align="left"| || align="center"|F/C || align="left"|Cal State Fullerton || align="center"|1 || align="center"| || 3 || 18 || 2 || 0 || 0 || 6.0 || 0.7 || 0.0 || 0.0 || align=center|
|-
|align="left"| || align="center"|F || align="left"|South Florida || align="center"|1 || align="center"| || 10 || 96 || 17 || 2 || 6 || 9.6 || 1.7 || 0.2 || 0.6 || align=center|
|-
|align="left"| || align="center"|F || align="left"|Albany State || align="center"|1 || align="center"| || 79 || 1,711 || 334 || 116 || 536 || 21.7 || 4.2 || 1.5 || 6.8 || align=center|
|-
|align="left" bgcolor="#FFCC00"|+ || align="center"|C || align="left"|Texas A&M || align="center" bgcolor="#CFECEC"|10 || align="center"|– || bgcolor="#CFECEC"|750 || 21,045 || bgcolor="#CFECEC"|7,988 || 557 || 7,078 || 28.1 || 10.7 || 0.7 || 9.4 || align=center|
|}

K to L

|-
|align="left" bgcolor="#FFCC00"|+ || align="center"|C || align="left"|Central Michigan || align="center"|8 || align="center"|– || 493 || 14,661 || 4,109 || 635 || 5,813 || 29.7 || 8.3 || 1.3 || 11.8 || align=center|
|-
|align="left"| || align="center"|F/C || align="left"|Guilford || align="center"|4 || align="center"|– || 306 || 10,336 || 2,805 || 1,189 || 4,847 || 33.8 || 9.2 || 3.9 || 15.8 || align=center|
|-
|align="left"| || align="center"|F || align="left"|Michigan State || align="center"|1 || align="center"| || 80 || 1,783 || 391 || 91 || 878 || 22.3 || 4.9 || 1.1 || 11.0 || align=center|
|-
|align="left"| || align="center"|F/C || align="left"|Notre Dame || align="center"|1 || align="center"| || 66 || 936 || 194 || 53 || 289 || 14.2 || 2.9 || 0.8 || 4.4 || align=center|
|-
|align="left"| || align="center"|G || align="left"|Cincinnati || align="center"|1 || align="center"| || 4 || 38 || 2 || 3 || 19 || 9.5 || 0.5 || 0.8 || 4.8 || align=center|
|-
|align="left"| || align="center"|G || align="left"|Loyola Marymount || align="center"|2 || align="center"|– || 96 || 1,281 || 151 || 93 || 541 || 13.3 || 1.6 || 1.0 || 5.6 || align=center|
|-
|align="left"| || align="center"|C || align="left"|BYU || align="center"|2 || align="center"|– || 98 || 1,706 || 430 || 74 || 317 || 17.4 || 4.4 || 0.8 || 3.2 || align=center|
|-
|align="left"| || align="center"|G || align="left"|Villanova || align="center"|1 || align="center"| || 11 || 243 || 32 || 20 || 69 || 22.1 || 2.9 || 1.8 || 6.3 || align=center|
|-
|align="left"| || align="center"|G/F || align="left"|Pittsburgh || align="center"|1 || align="center"| || 53 || 2,155 || 383 || 161 || 1,215 || bgcolor="#CFECEC"|40.7 || 7.2 || 3.0 || 22.9 || align=center|
|-
|align="left"| || align="center"|G || align="left"|Stanford || align="center"|1 || align="center"| || 74 || 1,674 || 142 || 328 || 338 || 22.6 || 1.9 || 4.4 || 4.6 || align=center|
|-
|align="left"| || align="center"|G || align="left"|Bowling Green || align="center"|1 || align="center"| || 67 || 1,468 || 118 || 239 || 411 || 21.9 || 1.8 || 3.6 || 6.1 || align=center|
|-
|align="left"| || align="center"|F || align="left"|Russia || align="center"|2 || align="center"|– || 34 || 168 || 16 || 13 || 39 || 4.9 || 0.5 || 0.4 || 1.1 || align=center|
|-
|align="left"| || align="center"|F/C || align="left"|Bradley || align="center"|1 || align="center"| || 10 || 85 || 25 || 3 || 17 || 8.5 || 2.5 || 0.3 || 1.7 || align=center|
|-
|align="left"| || align="center"|F/C || align="left"|Iowa || align="center"|2 || align="center"| || 120 || 2,024 || 675 || 138 || 633 || 16.9 || 5.6 || 1.2 || 5.3 || align=center|
|-
|align="left"| || align="center"|C || align="left"|San Diego State || align="center"|1 || align="center"| || 2 || 10 || 1 || 2 || 2 || 5.0 || 0.5 || 1.0 || 1.0 || align=center|
|-
|align="left"| || align="center"|G || align="left"|Bradley || align="center"|1 || align="center"| || 6 || 86 || 7 || 20 || 21 || 14.3 || 1.2 || 3.3 || 3.5 || align=center|
|-
|align="left" bgcolor="#FBCEB1"|* || align="center"|F || align="left"|San Diego State || align="center"|9 || align="center"|– || 57 || 1,904 || 402 || 280 || 1,543 || 33.4 || 5.1 || 4.9 || 27.1 || align=center|
|-
|align="left"| || align="center"|G || align="left"|Georgia || align="center"|1 || align="center"| || 10 || 45 || 9 || 5 || 14 || 4.5 || 0.9 || 0.5 || 1.4 || align=center|
|-
|align="left"| || align="center"|G || align="left"|LSU || align="center"|1 || align="center"| || 4 || 48 || 7 || 4 || 8 || 12.0 || 1.8 || 1.0 || 2.0 || align=center|
|-
|align="left"| || align="center"|G || align="left"|Peoria HS (IL) || align="center"|3 || align="center"|– || 145 || 3,950 || 456 || 698 || 1,077 || 27.2 || 3.1 || 4.8 || 7.4 || align=center|
|-
|align="left"| || align="center"|F/C || align="left"|Arizona State || align="center"|2 || align="center"|– || 61 || 597 || 122 || 35 || 179 || 9.8 || 2.0 || 0.6 || 2.9 || align=center|
|-
|align="left"| || align="center"|F || align="left"|Kentucky || align="center"|1 || align="center"| || 20 || 110 || 32 || 4 || 30 || 5.5 || 1.6 || 0.2 || 1.5 || align=center|
|-
|align="left"| || align="center"|G/F || align="left"|Alabama State || align="center"|1 || align="center"| || 1 || 4 || 0 || 0 || 0 || 4.0 || 0.0 || 0.0 || 0.0 || align=center|
|-
|align="left"| || align="center"|G || align="left"|Wake Forest || align="center"|1 || align="center"| || 30 || 213 || 31 || 25 || 134 || 7.1 || 1.0 || 0.8 || 4.5 || align=center|
|-
|align="left"| || align="center"|F || align="left"|UCLA || align="center"|1 || align="center"| || 5 || 25 || 4 || 1 || 7 || 5.0 || 0.8 || 0.2 || 1.4 || align=center|
|}

M

|-
|align="left"| || align="center"|F || align="left"|Canisius || align="center"|1 || align="center"| || 30 || 112 || 25 || 3 || 48 || 3.7 || 0.8 || 0.1 || 1.6 || align=center|
|-
|align="left"| || align="center"|F || align="left"|Duke || align="center"|8 || align="center"|– || 512 || 15,780 || 2,673 || 1,229 || 8,835 || 30.8 || 5.2 || 2.4 || 17.3 || align=center|
|-
|align="left" bgcolor="#FFFF99"|^ || align="center"|F/C || align="left"|Petersburg HS (VA) || align="center"|1 || align="center"| || 2 || 6 || 1 || 0 || 0 || 3.0 || 0.5 || 0.0 || 0.0 || align=center|
|-
|align="left"| || align="center"|F || align="left"|San Diego State || align="center"|1 || align="center"| || 28 || 277 || 58 || 12 || 53 || 9.9 || 2.1 || 0.4 || 1.9 || align=center|
|-
|align="left" bgcolor="#FFCC00"|+ || align="center"|F/C || align="left"|Kansas || align="center"|6 || align="center"|– || 373 || 12,676 || 2,399 || 1,132 || 7,120 || 34.0 || 6.4 || 3.0 || 19.1 || align=center|
|-
|align="left"| || align="center"|C || align="left"|Washington || align="center"|1 || align="center"| || 10 || 73 || 16 || 1 || 31 || 7.3 || 1.6 || 0.1 || 3.1 || align=center|
|-
|align="left"| || align="center"|G/F || align="left"|Duke || align="center"|3 || align="center"|– || 120 || 3,105 || 525 || 202 || 1,423 || 25.9 || 4.4 || 1.7 || 11.9 || align=center|
|-
|align="left"| || align="center"|C || align="left"|Serbia || align="center"|2 || align="center"|– || 56 || 542 || 239 || 30 || 359 || 9.7 || 4.3 || 0.5 || 6.4 || align=center|
|-
|align="left"| || align="center"|C || align="left"|Minnesota || align="center"|2 || align="center"|– || 54 || 549 || 119 || 18 || 113 || 10.2 || 2.2 || 0.3 || 2.1 || align=center|
|-
|align="left"| || align="center"|G || align="left"|UCLA || align="center"|4 || align="center"|– || 212 || 5,250 || 335 || 842 || 2,072 || 24.8 || 1.6 || 4.0 || 9.8 || align=center|
|-
|align="left"| || align="center"|G || align="left"|Murray State || align="center"|2 || align="center"|– || 143 || 2,685 || 290 || 109 || 956 || 18.8 || 2.0 || 0.8 || 6.7 || align=center|
|-
|align="left"| || align="center"|F || align="left"|Cincinnati || align="center"|1 || align="center"| || 42 || 940 || 181 || 18 || 217 || 22.4 || 4.3 || 0.4 || 5.2 || align=center|
|-
|align="left"| || align="center"|F || align="left"|Maryland || align="center"|1 || align="center"| || 80 || 2,127 || 455 || 67 || 741 || 26.6 || 5.7 || 0.8 || 9.3 || align=center|
|-
|align="left"| || align="center"|F || align="left"|Charlotte || align="center"|2 || align="center"|– || 111 || 3,590 || 875 || 337 || 1,552 || 32.3 || 7.9 || 3.0 || 14.0 || align=center|
|-
|align="left"| || align="center"|F || align="left"|Dayton || align="center"|1 || align="center"| || 76 || 2,666 || 567 || 150 || 1,535 || 35.1 || 7.5 || 2.0 || 20.2 || align=center|
|-
|align="left"| || align="center"|F || align="left"|Furman || align="center"|1 || align="center"| || 2 || 7 || 3 || 0 || 2 || 3.5 || 1.5 || 0.0 || 1.0 || align=center|
|-
|align="left"| || align="center"|G || align="left"|Florida State || align="center"|1 || align="center"| || 3 || 40 || 1 || 3 || 9 || 13.3 || 0.3 || 1.0 || 3.0 || align=center|
|-
|align="left"| || align="center"|F || align="left"|UCLA || align="center"|3 || align="center"|– || 159 || 3,122 || 348 || 71 || 735 || 19.6 || 2.2 || 0.4 || 4.6 || align=center|
|-
|align="left" bgcolor="#FFFF99"|^ || align="center"|F/C || align="left"|North Carolina || align="center"|5 || align="center"|– || 334 || 13,381 || 4,229 || 868 || 9,434 || 40.1 || 12.7 || 2.6 || 28.2 || align=center|
|-
|align="left"| || align="center"|F || align="left"|Kentucky || align="center"|1 || align="center"| || 36 || 353 || 68 || 23 || 88 || 9.8 || 1.9 || 0.6 || 2.4 || align=center|
|-
|align="left"| || align="center"|G || align="left"|Tennessee State || align="center"|1 || align="center"| || 41 || 727 || 75 || 123 || 212 || 17.7 || 1.8 || 3.0 || 5.2 || align=center|
|-
|align="left"| || align="center"|F/C || align="left"|Western Kentucky || align="center"|1 || align="center"| || 42 || 694 || 181 || 44 || 236 || 16.5 || 4.3 || 1.0 || 5.6 || align=center|
|-
|align="left"| || align="center"|F/C || align="left"|Memphis || align="center"|1 || align="center"| || 57 || 611 || 155 || 37 || 208 || 10.7 || 2.7 || 0.6 || 3.6 || align=center|
|-
|align="left"| || align="center"|G || align="left"|North Carolina || align="center"|3 || align="center"|– || 187 || 6,458 || 505 || 1,036 || 2,410 || 34.5 || 2.7 || 5.5 || 12.9 || align=center|
|-
|align="left"| || align="center"|G || align="left"|Northwestern || align="center"|1 || align="center"| || 80 || 843 || 54 || 161 || 311 || 10.5 || 0.7 || 2.0 || 3.9 || align=center|
|-
|align="left"| || align="center"|G || align="left"|SMU || align="center"|1 || align="center"| || 7 || 104 || 12 || 7 || 18 || 14.9 || 1.7 || 1.0 || 2.6 || align=center|
|-
|align="left"| || align="center"|F/C || align="left"|Maryland || align="center"|2 || align="center"|– || 70 || 978 || 258 || 85 || 349 || 14.0 || 3.7 || 1.2 || 5.0 || align=center|
|-
|align="left"| || align="center"|F || align="left"|Columbia || align="center"|3 || align="center"|– || 218 || 8,064 || 1,385 || 617 || 3,585 || 37.0 || 6.4 || 2.8 || 16.4 || align=center|
|-
|align="left"| || align="center"|F/C || align="left"|Marquette || align="center"|1 || align="center"| || 37 || 873 || 188 || 45 || 442 || 23.6 || 5.1 || 1.2 || 11.9 || align=center|
|-
|align="left"| || align="center"|F || align="left"|East St. Louis HS (IL) || align="center"|2 || align="center"|– || 163 || 4,360 || 930 || 283 || 1,540 || 26.7 || 5.7 || 1.7 || 9.4 || align=center|
|-
|align="left"| || align="center"|G || align="left"|Utah || align="center"|1 || align="center"| || 80 || 2,913 || 316 || 537 || 1,088 || 36.4 || 4.0 || 6.7 || 13.6 || align=center|
|-
|align="left"| || align="center"|G || align="left"|Rhode Island || align="center"|4 || align="center"|– || 245 || 8,887 || 912 || 650 || 3,382 || 36.3 || 3.7 || 2.7 || 13.8 || align=center|
|-
|align="left"| || align="center"|F || align="left"|Meridian CC || align="center"|1 || align="center"| || 19 || 278 || 47 || 7 || 66 || 14.6 || 2.5 || 0.4 || 3.5 || align=center|
|-
|align="left"| || align="center"|G || align="left"|West Virginia || align="center"|1 || align="center"| || 37 || 642 || 55 || 73 || 210 || 17.4 || 1.5 || 2.0 || 5.7 || align=center|
|-
|align="left"| || align="center"|F/C || align="left"|Nebraska || align="center"|1 || align="center"| || 74 || 1,178 || 246 || 47 || 396 || 15.9 || 3.3 || 0.6 || 5.4 || align=center|
|-
|align="left"| || align="center"|G || align="left"|Michigan || align="center"|1 || align="center"| || 10 || 54 || 5 || 5 || 9 || 5.4 || 0.5 || 0.5 || 0.9 || align=center|
|-
|align="left"| || align="center"|F || align="left"|Baylor || align="center"|1 || align="center"| || 22 || 156 || 51 || 11 || 102 || 7.1 || 2.3 || 0.5 || 4.6 || align=center|
|-
|align="left"| || align="center"|C || align="left"|Ohio State || align="center"|1 || align="center"| || 27 || 167 || 32 || 6 || 67 || 6.2 || 1.2 || 0.2 || 2.5 || align=center|
|-
|align="left"| || align="center"|G || align="left"|Providence || align="center"|1 || align="center"| || 40 || 693 || 77 || 108 || 225 || 17.3 || 1.9 || 2.7 || 5.6 || align=center|
|-
|align="left"| || align="center"|F || align="left"|Boston College || align="center"|2 || align="center"|– || 37 || 249 || 56 || 7 || 69 || 6.7 || 1.5 || 0.2 || 1.9 || align=center|
|-
|align="left"| || align="center"|F/C || align="left"|UC Irvine || align="center"|1 || align="center"| || 1 || 19 || 2 || 2 || 5 || 19.0 || 2.0 || 2.0 || 5.0 || align=center|
|-
|align="left"| || align="center"|F || align="left"|California || align="center"|5 || align="center"|– || 361 || 9,563 || 1,512 || 477 || 4,173 || 26.5 || 4.2 || 1.3 || 11.6 || align=center|
|}

N to P

|-
|align="left"| || align="center"|C || align="left"|UCLA || align="center"|6 || align="center"|– || 348 || 11,079 || 4,168 || 819 || 4,694 || 31.8 || 12.0 || 2.4 || 13.5 || align=center|
|-
|align="left"| || align="center"|C || align="left"|Auburn || align="center"|1 || align="center"| || 11 || 72 || 18 || 1 || 20 || 6.5 || 1.6 || 0.1 || 1.8 || align=center|
|-
|align="left"| || align="center"|C || align="left"|Senegal || align="center"|1 || align="center"| || 23 || 152 || 37 || 7 || 50 || 6.6 || 1.6 || 0.3 || 2.2 || align=center|
|-
|align="left"| || align="center"|F || align="left"|UNLV || align="center"|3 || align="center"|– || 137 || 3,938 || 492 || 214 || 1,584 || 28.7 || 3.6 || 1.6 || 11.6 || align=center|
|-
|align="left"| || align="center"|C || align="left"|Duke || align="center"|1 || align="center"| || 35 || 295 || 73 || 16 || 43 || 8.4 || 2.1 || 0.5 || 1.2 || align=center|
|-
|align="left"| || align="center"|G/F || align="left"|Ole Miss || align="center"|1 || align="center"| || 4 || 49 || 9 || 4 || 35 || 12.3 || 2.3 || 1.0 || 8.8 || align=center|
|-
|align="left"| || align="center"|F/C || align="left"|Arizona State || align="center"|2 || align="center"|– || 105 || 2,757 || 526 || 66 || 1,100 || 26.3 || 5.0 || 0.6 || 10.5 || align=center|
|-
|align="left" bgcolor="#FFCC00"|+ || align="center"|G || align="left"|Duquesne || align="center"|4 || align="center"|– || 283 || 9,403 || 679 || 2,540 || 4,127 || 33.2 || 2.4 || 9.0 || 14.6 || align=center|
|-
|align="left"| || align="center"|G || align="left"|Arizona || align="center"|1 || align="center"| || 22 || 323 || 32 || 24 || 161 || 14.7 || 1.5 || 1.1 || 7.3 || align=center|
|-
|align="left"| || align="center"|F || align="left"|Illinois || align="center"|6 || align="center"|– || 439 || 13,584 || 2,916 || 964 || 6,432 || 30.9 || 6.6 || 2.2 || 14.7 || align=center|
|-
|align="left"| || align="center"|F || align="left"|Marquette || align="center"|2 || align="center"|– || 125 || 1,523 || 158 || 46 || 605 || 12.2 || 1.3 || 0.4 || 4.8 || align=center|
|-
|align="left"| || align="center"|F || align="left"|Rhode Island || align="center"|5 || align="center"|– || 312 || 9,897 || 2,169 || 1,200 || 3,986 || 31.7 || 7.0 || 3.8 || 12.8 || align=center|
|-
|align="left"| || align="center"|F || align="left"|Villanova || align="center"|2 || align="center"|– || 35 || 204 || 20 || 3 || 44 || 5.8 || 0.6 || 0.1 || 1.3 || align=center|
|-
|align="left"| || align="center"|C || align="left"|Pacific || align="center"|5 || align="center"|– || 323 || 9,836 || 2,577 || 246 || 3,211 || 30.5 || 8.0 || 0.8 || 9.9 || align=center|
|-
|align="left"| || align="center"|F || align="left"|Houston || align="center"|4 || align="center"|– || 280 || 5,706 || 1,179 || 327 || 1,590 || 20.4 || 4.2 || 1.2 || 5.7 || align=center|
|-
|align="left"| || align="center"|F || align="left"|Starkville HS (MS) || align="center"|1 || align="center"| || 23 || 499 || 83 || 26 || 200 || 21.7 || 3.6 || 1.1 || 8.7 || align=center|
|-
|align="left"| || align="center"|G || align="left"|La Salle || align="center"|2 || align="center"| || 73 || 1,141 || 97 || 147 || 255 || 15.6 || 1.3 || 2.0 || 3.5 || align=center|
|-
|align="left"| || align="center"|F || align="left"|UNLV || align="center"|1 || align="center"| || 8 || 63 || 10 || 5 || 21 || 7.9 || 1.3 || 0.6 || 2.6 || align=center|
|-
|align="left"| || align="center"|G || align="left"|Fordham || align="center"|1 || align="center"| || 19 || 409 || 32 || 69 || 122 || 21.5 || 1.7 || 3.6 || 6.4 || align=center|
|-
|align="left"| || align="center"|F/C || align="left"|Duke || align="center"|2 || align="center"| || 82 || 1,524 || 321 || 60 || 439 || 18.6 || 3.9 || 0.7 || 5.4 || align=center|
|-
|align="left"| || align="center"|F || align="left"|Cincinnati || align="center"|1 || align="center"| || 20 || 327 || 64 || 17 || 102 || 16.4 || 3.2 || 0.9 || 5.1 || align=center|
|-
|align="left" bgcolor="#FFCC00"|+ || align="center"|G || align="left"|Wake Forest || align="center"|6 || align="center"|– || 409 || 13,885 || 1,733 || bgcolor="#CFECEC"|4,023 || 7,674 || 33.9 || 4.2 || bgcolor="#CFECEC"|9.8 || 18.8 || align=center|
|-
|align="left"| || align="center"|G || align="left"|Wisconsin || align="center"|1 || align="center"| || 4 || 12 || 1 || 1 || 2 || 3.0 || 0.3 || 0.3 || 0.5 || align=center|
|-
|align="left"| || align="center"|G || align="left"|Memphis || align="center"|1 || align="center"| || 10 || 66 || 7 || 14 || 13 || 6.6 || 0.7 || 1.4 || 1.3 || align=center|
|-
|align="left"| || align="center"|G || align="left"|Alcorn State || align="center"|1 || align="center"| || 2 || 23 || 2 || 3 || 9 || 11.5 || 1.0 || 1.5 || 4.5 || align=center|
|-
|align="left"| || align="center"|G/F || align="left"|Nebraska || align="center"|9 || align="center"|– || 616 || 12,655 || 1,520 || 674 || 5,269 || 20.5 || 2.5 || 1.1 || 8.6 || align=center|
|-
|align="left"| || align="center"|G/F || align="left"|Kansas || align="center"|2 || align="center"|– || 93 || 1,508 || 234 || 81 || 498 || 16.2 || 2.5 || 0.9 || 5.4 || align=center|
|-
|align="left"| || align="center"|G || align="left"|Rice || align="center"|1 || align="center"| || 69 || 1,280 || 135 || 60 || 685 || 18.6 || 2.0 || 0.9 || 9.9 || align=center|
|-
|align="left"| || align="center"|G/F || align="left"|Auburn || align="center"|3 || align="center"|– || 60 || 639 || 52 || 99 || 236 || 10.7 || 0.9 || 1.7 || 3.9 || align=center|
|-
|align="left"| || align="center"|G || align="left"|Pepperdine || align="center"|1 || align="center"| || 1 || 6 || 0 || 0 || 2 || 6.0 || 0.0 || 0.0 || 2.0 || align=center|
|-
|align="left"| || align="center"|F/C || align="left"|Virginia || align="center"|3 || align="center"|– || 109 || 2,978 || 821 || 73 || 994 || 27.3 || 7.5 || 0.7 || 9.1 || align=center|
|-
|align="left"| || align="center"|F/C || align="left"|North Carolina || align="center"|1 || align="center"| || 10 || 68 || 16 || 6 || 23 || 6.8 || 1.6 || 0.6 || 2.3 || align=center|
|-
|align="left"| || align="center"|F || align="left"|NC State || align="center"|1 || align="center"| || 64 || 1,228 || 331 || 47 || 353 || 19.2 || 5.2 || 0.7 || 5.5 || align=center|
|-
|align="left"| || align="center"|G || align="left"|Louisville || align="center"|1 || align="center"| || 20 || 333 || 34 || 38 || 105 || 16.7 || 1.7 || 1.9 || 5.3 || align=center|
|-
|align="left"| || align="center"|G || align="left"|Penn || align="center"|1 || align="center"| || 5 || 29 || 0 || 3 || 4 || 5.8 || 0.0 || 0.6 || 0.8 || align=center|
|-
|align="left"| || align="center"|G || align="left"|Argentina || align="center"|1 || align="center"| || 59 || 823 || 114 || 130 || 145 || 13.9 || 1.9 || 2.2 || 2.5 || align=center|
|}

R

|-
|align="left"| || align="center"|F || align="left"|Serbia || align="center"|1 || align="center"| || 30 || 885 || 171 || 64 || 320 || 29.5 || 5.7 || 2.1 || 10.7 || align=center|
|-
|align="left"| || align="center"|F/C || align="left"|Michigan State || align="center"|1 || align="center"| || 39 || 1,369 || 367 || 88 || 815 || 35.1 || 9.4 || 2.3 || 20.9 || align=center|
|-
|align="left"| || align="center"|G/F || align="left"|San Jose State || align="center"|1 || align="center"| || 25 || 153 || 30 || 17 || 55 || 6.1 || 1.2 || 0.7 || 2.2 || align=center|
|-
|align="left"| || align="center"|C || align="left"|Serbia || align="center"|2 || align="center"|– || 87 || 1,340 || 248 || 35 || 474 || 15.4 || 2.9 || 0.4 || 5.4 || align=center|
|-
|align="left"| || align="center"|G || align="left"|Washington || align="center"|1 || align="center"| || 5 || 31 || 0 || 5 || 5 || 6.2 || 0.0 || 1.0 || 1.0 || align=center|
|-
|align="left"| || align="center"|G || align="left"|Duke || align="center"|4 || align="center"|– || 266 || 7,691 || 551 || 431 || 4,208 || 28.9 || 2.1 || 1.6 || 15.8 || align=center|
|-
|align="left"| || align="center"|F/C || align="left"|Saint Louis || align="center"|1 || align="center"| || 39 || 419 || 120 || 9 || 193 || 10.7 || 3.1 || 0.2 || 4.9 || align=center|
|-
|align="left"| || align="center"|F || align="left"|Michigan || align="center"|1 || align="center"| || 18 || 262 || 41 || 24 || 66 || 14.6 || 2.3 || 1.3 || 3.7 || align=center|
|-
|align="left"| || align="center"|G || align="left"|UCLA || align="center"|5 || align="center"|– || 282 || 7,324 || 626 || 1,397 || 2,255 || 26.0 || 2.2 || 5.0 || 8.0 || align=center|
|-
|align="left"| || align="center"|G || align="left"|DePaul || align="center"|4 || align="center"|– || 281 || 7,216 || 1,286 || 381 || 3,362 || 25.7 || 4.6 || 1.4 || 12.0 || align=center|
|-
|align="left"| || align="center"|C || align="left"|Michigan || align="center"|1 || align="center"| || 40 || 434 || 112 || 11 || 177 || 10.9 || 2.8 || 0.3 || 4.4 || align=center|
|-
|align="left"| || align="center"|G || align="left"|Duke || align="center"|4 || align="center"|– || 243 || 6,366 || 520 || 613 || 2,693 || 26.2 || 2.1 || 2.5 || 11.1 || align=center|
|-
|align="left"| || align="center"|G || align="left"|Notre Dame || align="center"|2 || align="center"| || 67 || 846 || 104 || 176 || 249 || 12.6 || 1.6 || 2.6 || 3.7 || align=center|
|-
|align="left"| || align="center"|G || align="left"|Marquette || align="center"|1 || align="center"| || 59 || 1,657 || 147 || 233 || 641 || 28.1 || 2.5 || 3.9 || 10.9 || align=center|
|-
|align="left"| || align="center"|C || align="left"|LSU || align="center"|4 || align="center"|–– || 160 || 3,339 || 824 || 120 || 1,501 || 20.9 || 5.2 || 0.8 || 9.4 || align=center|
|-
|align="left"| || align="center"|G || align="left"|Alabama || align="center"|2 || align="center"|– || 84 || 1,511 || 138 || 153 || 647 || 18.0 || 1.6 || 1.8 || 7.7 || align=center|
|-
|align="left" bgcolor="#CCFFCC"|x || align="center"|G || align="left"|Boston College || align="center"|1 || align="center"| || 33 || 320 || 41 || 19 || 112 || 9.7 || 1.2 || 0.6 || 3.4 || align=center|
|-
|align="left"| || align="center"|G || align="left"|Washington || align="center"|1 || align="center"| || 9 || 126 || 11 || 20 || 46 || 14.0 || 1.2 || 2.2 || 5.1 || align=center|
|-
|align="left"| || align="center"|F || align="left"|Wake Forest || align="center"|4 || align="center"|– || 271 || 7,897 || 1,300 || 668 || 3,343 || 29.1 || 4.8 || 2.5 || 12.3 || align=center|
|-
|align="left"| || align="center"|C || align="left"|Arizona || align="center"|3 || align="center"|– || 213 || 3,625 || 643 || 171 || 926 || 17.0 || 3.0 || 0.8 || 4.3 || align=center|
|-
|align="left"| || align="center"|G || align="left"|George Mason || align="center"|1 || align="center"| || 2 || 3 || 2 || 0 || 0 || 1.5 || 1.0 || 0.0 || 0.0 || align=center|
|-
|align="left"| || align="center"|G || align="left"|SMU || align="center"|4 || align="center"|– || 302 || 6,379 || 742 || 362 || 1,449 || 21.1 || 2.5 || 1.2 || 4.8 || align=center|
|-
|align="left"| || align="center"|F/C || align="left"|BYU || align="center"|2 || align="center"|– || 42 || 154 || 33 || 7 || 75 || 3.7 || 0.8 || 0.2 || 1.8 || align=center|
|-
|align="left"| || align="center"|G || align="left"|Missouri || align="center"|1 || align="center"| || 7 || 58 || 6 || 4 || 9 || 8.3 || 0.9 || 0.6 || 1.3 || align=center|
|}

S

|-
|align="left"| || align="center"|C || align="left"|Senegal || align="center"|1 || align="center"| || 10 || 51 || 13 || 0 || 11 || 5.1 || 1.3 || 0.0 || 1.1 || align=center|
|-
|align="left"| || align="center"|C || align="left"|Florida || align="center"|1 || align="center"| || 15 || 116 || 22 || 4 || 34 || 7.7 || 1.5 || 0.3 || 2.3 || align=center|
|-
|align="left"| || align="center"|C || align="left"|Colorado State || align="center"|2 || align="center"|– || 147 || 1,735 || 488 || 184 || 444 || 11.8 || 3.3 || 1.3 || 3.0 || align=center|
|-
|align="left"| || align="center"|F || align="left"|Virginia || align="center"|1 || align="center"| || 52 || 748 || 174 || 44 || 248 || 14.4 || 3.3 || 0.8 || 4.8 || align=center|
|-
|align="left"| || align="center"|G || align="left"|St. John's || align="center"|3 || align="center"|– || 202 || 5,661 || 692 || 388 || 2,569 || 28.0 || 3.4 || 1.9 || 12.7 || align=center|
|-
|align="left" bgcolor="#CCFFCC"|x || align="center"|G || align="left"|Wichita State || align="center"|1 || align="center"| || 25 || 694 || 56 || 58 || 273 || 27.8 || 2.2 || 2.3 || 10.9 || align=center|
|-
|align="left"| || align="center"|F/C || align="left"|Notre Dame || align="center"|3 || align="center"|– || 124 || 4,237 || 1,143 || 282 || 1,729 || 34.2 || 9.2 || 2.3 || 13.9 || align=center|
|-
|align="left"| || align="center"|F || align="left"|Army || align="center"|1 || align="center"| || 36 || 366 || 62 || 23 || 91 || 10.2 || 1.7 || 0.6 || 2.5 || align=center|
|-
|align="left"| || align="center"|G/F || align="left"|DePaul || align="center"|3 || align="center"|– || 159 || 4,593 || 763 || 312 || 1,746 || 28.9 || 4.8 || 2.0 || 11.0 || align=center|
|-
|align="left"| || align="center"|F || align="left"|Murray State || align="center"|2 || align="center"|– || 112 || 1,129 || 303 || 46 || 288 || 10.1 || 2.7 || 0.4 || 2.6 || align=center|
|-
|align="left"| || align="center"|F || align="left"|Baylor || align="center"|5 || align="center"|–– || 160 || 2,583 || 652 || 57 || 665 || 16.1 || 4.1 || 0.4 || 4.2 || align=center|
|-
|align="left"| || align="center"|G/F || align="left"|Tulsa || align="center"|1 || align="center"| || 70 || 1,988 || 245 || 93 || 819 || 28.4 || 3.5 || 1.3 || 11.7 || align=center|
|-
|align="left"| || align="center"|F/C || align="left"|Pittsburgh || align="center"|4 || align="center"|– || 272 || 8,906 || 1,898 || 407 || 4,994 || 32.7 || 7.0 || 1.5 || 18.4 || align=center|
|-
|align="left"| || align="center"|G || align="left"|New Mexico || align="center"|2 || align="center"|– || 46 || 577 || 43 || 32 || 193 || 12.5 || 0.9 || 0.7 || 4.2 || align=center|
|-
|align="left"| || align="center"|F || align="left"|Boston College || align="center"|2 || align="center"|– || 123 || 1,818 || 404 || 115 || 843 || 14.8 || 3.3 || 0.9 || 6.9 || align=center|
|-
|align="left"| || align="center"|G/F || align="left"|Louisville || align="center"|3 || align="center"|– || 152 || 4,398 || 638 || 329 || 2,626 || 28.9 || 4.2 || 2.2 || 17.3 || align=center|
|-
|align="left"| || align="center"|C || align="left"|Kentucky State || align="center"|2 || align="center"|– || 154 || 6,015 || 2,130 || 303 || 2,740 || 39.1 || bgcolor="#CFECEC"|13.8 || 2.0 || 17.8 || align=center|
|-
|align="left"| || align="center"|F || align="left"|Ohio State || align="center"|1 || align="center"| || 72 || 858 || 182 || 46 || 211 || 11.9 || 2.5 || 0.6 || 2.9 || align=center|
|-
|align="left"| || align="center"|F || align="left"|Oak Hill Academy (VA) || align="center"|1 || align="center"| || 32 || 459 || 125 || 42 || 181 || 14.3 || 3.9 || 1.3 || 5.7 || align=center|
|-
|align="left"| || align="center"|F || align="left"|BYU || align="center"|1 || align="center"| || 29 || 319 || 56 || 20 || 153 || 11.0 || 1.9 || 0.7 || 5.3 || align=center|
|-
|align="left"| || align="center"|G || align="left"|San Francisco || align="center"|2 || align="center"|– || 124 || 3,824 || 273 || 605 || 1,913 || 30.8 || 2.2 || 4.9 || 15.4 || align=center|
|-
|align="left" bgcolor="#FFCC00"|+ || align="center"|G/F || align="left"|Buffalo State || align="center"|9 || align="center"|– || 715 || bgcolor="#CFECEC"|24,393 || 2,985 || 3,498 || bgcolor="#CFECEC"|12,735 || 34.1 || 4.2 || 4.9 || 17.8 || align=center|
|-
|align="left"| || align="center"|G || align="left"|UNLV || align="center"|1 || align="center"| || 5 || 43 || 3 || 6 || 11 || 8.6 || 0.6 || 1.2 || 2.2 || align=center|
|-
|align="left"| || align="center"|C || align="left"|Canisius || align="center"|1 || align="center"| || 10 || 70 || 19 || 3 || 10 || 7.0 || 1.9 || 0.3 || 1.0 || align=center|
|-
|align="left"| || align="center"|F/C || align="left"|Florida || align="center"|1 || align="center"| || 82 || 1,286 || 373 || 65 || 711 || 15.7 || 4.5 || 0.8 || 8.7 || align=center|
|-
|align="left"| || align="center"|C || align="left"|UNLV || align="center"|3 || align="center"|– || 139 || 2,578 || 542 || 108 || 909 || 18.5 || 3.9 || 0.8 || 6.5 || align=center|
|-
|align="left"| || align="center"|G/F || align="left"|Cincinnati || align="center"|1 || align="center"| || 43 || 680 || 108 || 60 || 204 || 15.8 || 2.5 || 1.4 || 4.7 || align=center|
|-
|align="left"| || align="center"|F || align="left"|USC || align="center"|1 || align="center"| || 4 || 12 || 2 || 0 || 2 || 3.0 || 0.5 || 0.0 || 0.5 || align=center|
|-
|align="left"| || align="center"|F || align="left"|Colorado || align="center"|1 || align="center"| || 1 || 1 || 0 || 0 || 0 || 1.0 || 0.0 || 0.0 || 0.0 || align=center|
|-
|align="left"| || align="center"|C || align="left"|Maryland || align="center"|1 || align="center"| || 7 || 24 || 6 || 0 || 10 || 3.4 || 0.9 || 0.0 || 1.4 || align=center|
|-
|align="left"| || align="center"|F || align="left"|Xavier || align="center"|1 || align="center"| || 28 || 491 || 108 || 7 || 118 || 17.5 || 3.9 || 0.3 || 4.2 || align=center|
|-
|align="left"| || align="center"|F || align="left"|Georgetown || align="center"|1 || align="center"| || 2 || 7 || 2 || 1 || 2 || 3.5 || 1.0 || 0.5 || 1.0 || align=center|
|-
|align="left"| || align="center"|F/C || align="left"|Austin Peay || align="center"|1 || align="center"| || 1 || 1 || 0 || 0 || 0 || 1.0 || 0.0 || 0.0 || 0.0 || align=center|
|}

T to V

|-
|align="left"| || align="center"|G || align="left"|Princeton || align="center"|4 || align="center"|– || 219 || 6,552 || 461 || 1,024 || 2,385 || 29.9 || 2.1 || 4.7 || 10.9 || align=center|
|-
|align="left"| || align="center"|F || align="left"|Michigan || align="center"|3 || align="center"|– || 179 || 5,245 || 938 || 221 || 2,648 || 29.3 || 5.2 || 1.2 || 14.8 || align=center|
|-
|align="left"| || align="center"|G || align="left"|Iowa State || align="center"|1 || align="center"| || 51 || 771 || 87 || 106 || 289 || 15.1 || 1.7 || 2.1 || 5.7 || align=center|
|-
|align="left"| || align="center"|G || align="left"|Abraham Lincoln HS (NY) || align="center"|1 || align="center"| || 39 || 582 || 41 || 114 || 169 || 14.9 || 1.1 || 2.9 || 4.3 || align=center|
|-
|align="left"| || align="center"|G || align="left"|LSU || align="center"|1 || align="center"| || 26 || 510 || 64 || 37 || 123 || 19.6 || 2.5 || 1.4 || 4.7 || align=center|
|-
|align="left"| || align="center"|G || align="left"|Serbia || align="center"|2 || align="center"|– || 60 || 1,284 || 142 || 241 || 477 || 21.4 || 2.4 || 4.0 || 8.0 || align=center|
|-
|align="left"| || align="center"|G/F || align="left"|Stanford || align="center"|1 || align="center"| || 33 || 304 || 28 || 33 || 116 || 9.2 || 0.8 || 1.0 || 3.5 || align=center|
|-
|align="left"| || align="center"|G || align="left"|Indiana || align="center"|1 || align="center"| || 6 || 69 || 8 || 12 || 13 || 11.5 || 1.3 || 2.0 || 2.2 || align=center|
|-
|align="left"| || align="center"|F || align="left"|Villanova || align="center"|3 || align="center"|– || 149 || 4,214 || 747 || 352 || 1,711 || 28.3 || 5.0 || 2.4 || 11.5 || align=center|
|-
|align="left"| || align="center"|F || align="left"|Georgia || align="center"|1 || align="center"| || 24 || 119 || 24 || 3 || 57 || 5.0 || 1.0 || 0.1 || 2.4 || align=center|
|-
|align="left"| || align="center"|F || align="left"|Florida State || align="center"|3 || align="center"|– || 201 || 6,217 || 918 || 262 || 2,747 || 30.9 || 4.6 || 1.3 || 13.7 || align=center|
|-
|align="left"| || align="center"|G || align="left"|South Carolina || align="center"|2 || align="center"|– || 137 || 1,469 || 184 || 86 || 344 || 10.7 || 1.3 || 0.6 || 2.5 || align=center|
|-
|align="left"| || align="center"|F/C || align="left"|Arizona || align="center"|1 || align="center"| || 49 || 640 || 108 || 30 || 187 || 13.1 || 2.2 || 0.6 || 3.8 || align=center|
|-
|align="left"| || align="center"|F/C || align="left"|Notre Dame || align="center"|1 || align="center"| || 34 || 305 || 51 || 5 || 82 || 9.0 || 1.5 || 0.1 || 2.4 || align=center|
|-
|align="left"| || align="center"|G/F || align="left"|James Madison || align="center"|1 || align="center"| || 2 || 17 || 1 || 1 || 6 || 8.5 || 0.5 || 0.5 || 3.0 || align=center|
|-
|align="left"| || align="center"|F || align="left"|Gonzaga || align="center"|1 || align="center"| || 65 || 701 || 152 || 35 || 121 || 10.8 || 2.3 || 0.5 || 1.9 || align=center|
|-
|align="left"| || align="center"|F || align="left"|Turkey || align="center"|2 || align="center"|– || 100 || 1,097 || 188 || 70 || 347 || 11.0 || 1.9 || 0.7 || 3.5 || align=center|
|-
|align="left"| || align="center"|G || align="left"|Memphis || align="center"|1 || align="center"| || 3 || 31 || 5 || 3 || 4 || 10.3 || 1.7 || 1.0 || 1.3 || align=center|
|-
|align="left"| || align="center"|F/C || align="left"|Baylor || align="center"|1 || align="center"| || 33 || 128 || 26 || 8 || 29 || 3.9 || 0.8 || 0.2 || 0.9 || align=center|
|-
|align="left"| || align="center"|G || align="left"|Kansas || align="center"|3 || align="center"|– || 178 || 3,878 || 359 || 936 || 1,488 || 21.8 || 2.0 || 5.3 || 8.4 || align=center|
|-
|align="left"| || align="center"|F || align="left"|Green Bay || align="center"|1 || align="center"| || 15 || 31 || 6 || 1 || 9 || 2.1 || 0.4 || 0.1 || 0.6 || align=center|
|-
|align="left"| || align="center"|F || align="left"|UCLA || align="center"|1 || align="center"| || 41 || 494 || 48 || 25 || 254 || 12.0 || 1.2 || 0.6 || 6.2 || align=center|
|-
|align="left"| || align="center"|F || align="left"|Michigan || align="center"|8 || align="center"|– || 558 || 15,671 || 4,471 || 607 || 6,614 || 28.1 || 8.0 || 1.1 || 11.9 || align=center|
|-
|align="left"| || align="center"|C || align="left"|Croatia || align="center"|2 || align="center"|– || 67 || 1,008 || 269 || 36 || 197 || 15.0 || 4.0 || 0.5 || 2.9 || align=center|
|-
|align="left"| || align="center"|G || align="left"|Slovenia || align="center"|1 || align="center"| || 2 || 10 || 3 || 0 || 5 || 5.0 || 1.5 || 0.0 || 2.5 || align=center|
|}

W to Z

|-
|align="left"| || align="center"|G || align="left"|Florida State || align="center"|1 || align="center"| || 1 || 1 || 0 || 0 || 0 || 1.0 || 0.0 || 0.0 || 0.0 || align=center|
|-
|align="left"| || align="center"|G || align="left"|California || align="center"|2 || align="center"|– || 92 || 1,479 || 206 || 113 || 509 || 16.1 || 2.2 || 1.2 || 5.5 || align=center|
|-
|align="left" bgcolor="#FFFF99"|^ || align="center"|F/C || align="left"|UCLA || align="center"|4 || align="center"|– || 169 || 4,559 || 1,526 || 493 || 2,003 || 27.0 || 9.0 || 2.9 || 11.9 || align=center|
|-
|align="left"|Wang Zhizhi || align="center"|C || align="left"|China || align="center"|2 || align="center"|– || 43 || 421 || 81 || 10 || 186 || 9.8 || 1.9 || 0.2 || 4.3 || align=center|
|-
|align="left"| || align="center"|F/C || align="left"|Jackson State || align="center"|3 || align="center"|– || 131 || 2,579 || 846 || 113 || 790 || 19.7 || 6.5 || 0.9 || 6.0 || align=center|
|-
|align="left"| || align="center"|G || align="left"|Oklahoma || align="center"|1 || align="center"| || 19 || 134 || 12 || 27 || 37 || 7.1 || 0.6 || 1.4 || 1.9 || align=center|
|-
|align="left"| || align="center"|G || align="left"|Saint Joseph's || align="center"|1 || align="center"| || 58 || 713 || 58 || 153 || 215 || 12.3 || 1.0 || 2.6 || 3.7 || align=center|
|-
|align="left"| || align="center"|G || align="left"|Middle Tennessee || align="center"|1 || align="center"| || 4 || 28 || 2 || 5 || 0 || 7.0 || 0.5 || 1.3 || 0.0 || align=center|
|-
|align="left"| || align="center"|F/C || align="left"|Villanova || align="center"|2 || align="center"|– || 43 || 681 || 198 || 44 || 175 || 15.8 || 4.6 || 1.0 || 4.1 || align=center|
|-
|align="left"| || align="center"|F/C || align="left"|American || align="center"|1 || align="center"| || 82 || 2,764 || 800 || 125 || 927 || 33.7 || 9.8 || 1.5 || 11.3 || align=center|
|-
|align="left"| || align="center"|G || align="left"|Villanova || align="center"|2 || align="center"|– || 8 || 46 || 4 || 9 || 22 || 5.8 || 0.5 || 1.1 || 2.8 || align=center|
|-
|align="left"| || align="center"|F || align="left"|Illinois || align="center"|2 || align="center"|– || 139 || 3,766 || 662 || 189 || 1,525 || 27.1 || 4.8 || 1.4 || 11.0 || align=center|
|-
|align="left"| || align="center"|G || align="left"|Penn State || align="center"|2 || align="center"|– || 142 || 2,333 || 170 || 410 || 471 || 16.4 || 1.2 || 2.9 || 3.3 || align=center|
|-
|align="left"| || align="center"|G || align="left"|Alabama || align="center"|1 || align="center"| || 8 || 90 || 16 || 22 || 34 || 11.3 || 2.0 || 2.8 || 4.3 || align=center|
|-
|align="left"| || align="center"|F || align="left"|Pepperdine || align="center"|2 || align="center"|– || 54 || 786 || 132 || 26 || 336 || 14.6 || 2.4 || 0.5 || 6.2 || align=center|
|-
|align="left"| || align="center"|F || align="left"|South Alabama || align="center"|4 || align="center"|– || 229 || 4,431 || 574 || 187 || 1,885 || 19.3 || 2.5 || 0.8 || 8.2 || align=center|
|-
|align="left"| || align="center"|F/C || align="left"|Marquette || align="center"|6 || align="center"|– || 275 || 4,979 || 1,473 || 200 || 2,024 || 18.1 || 5.4 || 0.7 || 7.4 || align=center|
|-
|align="left"| || align="center"|F/C || align="left"|UCLA || align="center"|3 || align="center"|– || 199 || 5,251 || 1,037 || 450 || 1,600 || 26.4 || 5.2 || 2.3 || 8.0 || align=center|
|-
|align="left"| || align="center"|G || align="left"|Washington || align="center"|2 || align="center"|– || 44 || 268 || 19 || 18 || 111 || 6.1 || 0.4 || 0.4 || 2.5 || align=center|
|-
|align="left"| || align="center"|F || align="left"|Maryland || align="center"|4 || align="center"|– || 213 || 3,481 || 810 || 128 || 1,374 || 16.3 || 3.8 || 0.6 || 6.5 || align=center|
|-
|align="left"| || align="center"|F || align="left"|Long Beach State || align="center"|1 || align="center"| || 61 || 1,013 || 182 || 52 || 504 || 16.6 || 3.0 || 0.9 || 8.3 || align=center|
|-
|align="left" bgcolor="#FFFF99"|^ || align="center"|G/F || align="left"|UCLA || align="center"|1 || align="center"| || 13 || 195 || 29 || 15 || 75 || 15.0 || 2.2 || 1.2 || 5.8 || align=center|
|-
|align="left" bgcolor="#FFFF99"|^ || align="center"|G/F || align="left"|Georgia || align="center"|1 || align="center"| || 25 || 948 || 176 || 55 || 727 || 37.9 || 7.0 || 2.2 || 29.1 || align=center|
|-
|align="left"| || align="center"|F || align="left"|Idaho State || align="center"|1 || align="center"| || 10 || 38 || 3 || 2 || 14 || 3.8 || 0.3 || 0.2 || 1.4 || align=center|
|-
|align="left"| || align="center"|F/C || align="left"|Xavier || align="center"|2 || align="center"|– || 68 || 671 || 146 || 16 || 144 || 9.9 || 2.1 || 0.2 || 2.1 || align=center|
|-
|align="left"| || align="center"|G || align="left"|Villanova || align="center"|1 || align="center"| || 2 || 10 || 1 || 3 || 2 || 5.0 || 0.5 || 1.5 || 1.0 || align=center|
|-
|align="left"| || align="center"|F/C || align="left"|Arizona || align="center"|1 || align="center"| || 65 || 2,157 || 492 || 122 || 1,029 || 33.2 || 7.6 || 1.9 || 15.8 || align=center|
|-
|align="left"| || align="center"|G || align="left"|NC State || align="center"|1 || align="center"| || 38 || 707 || 56 || 43 || 209 || 18.6 || 1.5 || 1.1 || 5.5 || align=center|
|-
|align="left"| || align="center"|G || align="left"|Colorado || align="center"|2 || align="center"|– || 117 || 2,558 || 204 || 405 || 654 || 21.9 || 1.7 || 3.5 || 5.6 || align=center|
|-
|align="left"| || align="center"|G/F || align="left"|Portland State || align="center"|4 || align="center"|– || 273 || 6,097 || 469 || 480 || 4,467 || 22.3 || 1.7 || 1.8 || 16.4 || align=center|
|-
|align="left"| || align="center"|F/C || align="left"|LSU || align="center"|2 || align="center"|– || 108 || 2,363 || 443 || 239 || 683 || 21.9 || 4.1 || 2.2 || 6.3 || align=center|
|-
|align="left"| || align="center"|G || align="left"|St. John's || align="center"|1 || align="center"| || 9 || 114 || 20 || 17 || 34 || 12.7 || 2.2 || 1.9 || 3.8 || align=center|
|-
|align="left" bgcolor="#CCFFCC"|x || align="center"|G || align="left"|South Gwinnett HS (GA) || align="center"|2 || align="center"|– || 154 || 4,582 || 420 || 819 || 3,280 || 29.8 || 2.7 || 5.3 || 21.3 || align=center|
|-
|align="left"| || align="center"|F || align="left"|Arizona || align="center"|1 || align="center"| || 10 || 34 || 12 || 3 || 10 || 3.4 || 1.2 || 0.3 || 1.0 || align=center|
|-
|align="left"| || align="center"|G || align="left"|Alabama || align="center"|2 || align="center"|– || 74 || 2,195 || 155 || 283 || 1,020 || 29.7 || 2.1 || 3.8 || 13.8 || align=center|
|-
|align="left"| || align="center"|G/F || align="left"|Georgetown || align="center"|3 || align="center"|– || 103 || 2,293 || 312 || 171 || 1,067 || 22.3 || 3.0 || 1.7 || 10.4 || align=center|
|-
|align="left"| || align="center"|F/C || align="left"|Dwight Morrow HS (NJ) || align="center"|1 || align="center"| || 56 || 1,079 || 219 || 38 || 376 || 19.3 || 3.9 || 0.7 || 6.7 || align=center|
|-
|align="left"| || align="center"|C || align="left"|Cincinnati || align="center"|1 || align="center"| || 46 || 713 || 230 || 48 || 240 || 15.5 || 5.0 || 1.0 || 5.2 || align=center|
|-
|align="left"| || align="center"|F || align="left"|Marquette || align="center"|1 || align="center"| || 15 || 274 || 32 || 10 || 105 || 18.3 || 2.1 || 0.7 || 7.0 || align=center|
|-
|align="left"| || align="center"|G || align="left"|North Texas || align="center"|2 || align="center"|– || 104 || 1,692 || 169 || 181 || 484 || 16.3 || 1.6 || 1.7 || 4.7 || align=center|
|-
|align="left"| || align="center"|G || align="left"|Penn || align="center"|2 || align="center"|– || 97 || 2,146 || 118 || 385 || 655 || 22.1 || 1.2 || 4.0 || 6.8 || align=center|
|-
|align="left"| || align="center"|F/C || align="left"|North Carolina || align="center"|3 || align="center"|– || 185 || 3,912 || 690 || 273 || 1,076 || 21.1 || 3.7 || 1.5 || 5.8 || align=center|
|-
|align="left"| || align="center"|G/F || align="left"|North Carolina || align="center"|2 || align="center"|– || 105 || 2,514 || 326 || 181 || 1,187 || 23.9 || 3.1 || 1.7 || 11.3 || align=center|
|-
|align="left"| || align="center"|G || align="left"|La Salle || align="center"|3 || align="center"|– || 143 || 1,021 || 87 || 245 || 337 || 7.1 || 0.6 || 1.7 || 2.4 || align=center|
|-
|align="left"| || align="center"|G/F || align="left"|Indiana || align="center"|2 || align="center"|– || 154 || 4,660 || 352 || 469 || 2,700 || 30.3 || 2.3 || 3.0 || 17.5 || align=center|
|-
|align="left"| || align="center"|F/C || align="left"|Memphis || align="center"|3 || align="center"|– || 194 || 5,138 || 1,438 || 137 || 1,503 || 26.5 || 7.4 || 0.7 || 7.7 || align=center|
|-
|align="left"| || align="center"|G || align="left"|Wake Forest || align="center"|1 || align="center"| || 44 || 889 || 66 || 152 || 235 || 20.2 || 1.5 || 3.5 || 5.3 || align=center|
|-
|align="left"| || align="center"|G/F || align="left"|Houston || align="center"|1 || align="center"| || 45 || 459 || 86 || 24 || 219 || 10.2 || 1.9 || 0.5 || 4.9 || align=center|
|-
|align="left"| || align="center"|G/F || align="left"|USC || align="center"|1 || align="center"| || 22 || 518 || 36 || 10 || 214 || 23.5 || 1.6 || 0.5 || 9.7 || align=center|
|-
|align="left" bgcolor="#CCFFCC"|x || align="center"|C || align="left"|Croatia || align="center"|1 || align="center"| || 26 || 524 || 200 || 38 || 244 || 20.2 || 7.7 || 1.5 || 9.4 || align=center|
|}

References

External links
Los Angeles Clippers official website

National Basketball Association all-time rosters

roster